RAF Moreton-in-Marsh was a Royal Air Force station near Moreton-in-Marsh, Gloucestershire. It was opened in November 1940 with three concrete and tarmac runways and five aircraft hangars. It closed for operational flying in early 1948. The base remained in use as a relief runway and for training. After a period of care and maintenance, the Station was handed over to the Home Office in 1955.

The town's environs are quite flat and low-lying although it is situated at the northern extremity of the Cotswold Hills range. During World War II, a large area of this flat land to the east of the town was developed as an airfield and became the base of 21 OTU (Operational Training Unit) RAF, flying mainly Vickers Wellington bombers. It is highly likely that the airfield inspired the title of the radio comedy series Much Binding in the Marsh. Two of the programme's stars, Kenneth Horne and Richard Murdoch, had served there as flying instructors.

Current use
The former airfield is now home to the Fire Service College where senior fire officers from brigades all over the UK undergo operational, management and leadership training.

References

Citations

External links

The Wellington Aviation Museum. The website has a detailed history of the station

Royal Air Force stations in Gloucestershire
RAF